Jean Badal (7 March 1927 – 9 October 2015) was a Hungarian-born French cinematographer.

References

External links
 

1927 births
2015 deaths
Hungarian cinematographers
Hungarian expatriates in France
Film people from Budapest